Cecrope Barilli (April 2, 1839 – June 23, 1911) was an Italian painter.

Not to be confused with the Italian actor known for Before the Revolution.*

Born in Parma, as a young man he joined the forces fighting for Italian independence at the Battle of Palestro. Afterwards he moved to Florence, where he was influenced by the Macchiaioli painters, then to Paris where he frequented the studio of Gustave Doré. In 1870, he returned to Italy. 
 
He frescoed the prefecture and sala consigliare of the Municipal Palace of Parma. In 1877, he painted the theater curtain or Sipario for the Teatro Comunale of Montecarotto. In 1889, he was nominated director of the Parmesan Academy of Fine Arts, and the next year was elected consigliere comunale of Parma. He exhibited a canvas of La Vendemmia at the 1883 Promotrice of Florence, and a La Ciociara at the 1885 exhibition of Turin. He died in Parma in 1911. His son, Latino Barilli was also a painter.

References

External links

1839 births
1911 deaths
19th-century Italian painters
Italian male painters
20th-century Italian painters
Painters from Parma
19th-century Italian male artists
20th-century Italian male artists